Ingersoll Axles is a member of the IMT Partnership. It was founded as a small factory in the town of Ingersoll, Ontario, Canada in 1913 for the production of a soap called "Fun to Wash." The soap had a very short life, and the factory was soon converted to make brooms. In 1914, it was purchased by E.A. Wilson, who used the facility to create Ingersoll Machine & Tool in 1915.

Ingersoll Machine & Tool specialized in the manufacture of steering gear assemblies for cars and boats – including car starters, steering gears, millimeter shells, truck axle parts, house trailer parts, and machine parts. IMT established a major presence within the automotive industry, and by the early 1930s, IMT made every steering gear assembly for Canadian-built Ford, Mercury, Dodge, Chrysler, DeSoto, Plymouth, Hudson, and Nash cars.

The next several decades saw major growth and expansion of the company's ventures, and IMT became publicly owned in 1947 with a listing on the Toronto Stock Exchange. By the early 1970s, IMT had branched out into the production of washing machines and even hovercraft.

In 1970, Ivaco acquired a majority interest in IMT, further strengthening its holdings in 1981 with the acquisition of PC Forge. IMT also was awarded a 10-year, $100 million federal contract for large-caliber ammunition shells around this time. The following year, a new, modern facility was built to replace IMT's original building – with the help of a $125,000 grant from the Town of Ingersoll.

IMT developed its own self-steering axle in 1990. The resulting product, now known as the SmartSteer Axle, remains the lightest and strongest leading kingpin self-steering axle in the world.

References

Auto parts suppliers of Canada
Companies based in Ontario